Brian Willis (2 January 1930 – 2 September 1951) was  a former Australian rules footballer who played with Footscray in the Victorian Football League (VFL).		

Willis collapsed and died aged 21. It is believed he suffered a brain haemorrhage. 

Willis played in the opening match of the season but was dropped after two games. He received a severe ankle injury playing in the reserves that kept him out of football for the rest of the season.

Notes

External links 
		

1930 births
1951 deaths
Australian rules footballers from Victoria (Australia)
Western Bulldogs players
West Footscray Football Club players